Synthetoceratinae is an extinct subfamily of Protoceratidae, deer-like herbivorous mammals belonging to the order Artiodactyla.

Taxonomy
Synthetoceratinae was named by Frick (1937). Its type genus is Synthetoceras. It was considered monophyletic by Webb et al. (2003). It was assigned to Protoceratidae by Webb (1981), Prothero (1998), Webb et al. (2003), Hulbert and Whitmore (2006) and Prothero and Ludtke (2007).

Tribes
Synthetoceratinae contains the tribes Kyptoceratini and Synthetoceratini.
Tribe Kyptoceratini
 Genus Kyptoceras
 Genus Syndyoceras
Tribe Synthetoceratini
 Genus Lambdoceras
 Genus Prosynthetoceras
 Genus Synthetoceras

References

Protoceratids
Miocene even-toed ungulates
Miocene mammals of North America
Aquitanian first appearances
Zanclean extinctions